The 2019–20 Abilene Christian Wildcats men's basketball team represented Abilene Christian University in the 2019–20 NCAA Division I men's basketball season. The Wildcats, led by ninth-year head coach Joe Golding, played their home games at the Moody Coliseum in Abilene, Texas as members of the Southland Conference. They finished the season 20–11, 15–5 in Southland play to finish in a tie for second place. As the No. 2 seed, they received a double-bye to the semifinals of the Southland tournament, however, the tournament was cancelled amid the COVID-19 pandemic.

Previous season
The Wildcats finished the 2018–19 season 27–7 overall, 14–4 in Southland play, to finish in second place. In the Southland tournament, they defeated Southeastern Louisiana in the semifinals, advancing to the championship game, where they defeated New Orleans, earning their first trip to the NCAA tournament in school history. They received the No. 15 seed in the Midwest Region, where they were matched up against No. 2 seeded Kentucky, ultimately losing 44–79.

Roster

Schedule and results

|-
!colspan=12 style=| Regular season

|-
!colspan=12 style=| Southland tournament
|- style="background:#bbbbbb"
| style="text-align:center"|March 13, 20207:00 pm, ESPN+
| style="text-align:center"| (2)
| vs. Semifinals
| colspan=2 rowspan=1 style="text-align:center"|Cancelled due to the COVID-19 pandemic
| style="text-align:center"|Merrell CenterKaty, TX
|-

Source

See also 
2019–20 Abilene Christian Wildcats women's basketball team

References

Abilene Christian Wildcats men's basketball seasons
Abilene Christian Wildcats
Abilene Christian Wildcats men's basketball
Abilene Christian Wildcats men's basketball